The 2017–18 Atlantic Coast Conference women's basketball season began with practices in October 2017, followed by the start of the 2017–18 NCAA Division I women's basketball season in November. Conference play started in late December 2017 and will conclude in March with the 2018 ACC women's basketball tournament at the Greensboro Coliseum in Greensboro, NC.  The regular season and tournament champions were the Louisville Cardinals.

Head coaches

Coaching changes
There were no coaching changes prior to the 2017–18 season.  However, after the season ended, Erik Johnson resigned as the head coach of Boston College. Also after the season concluded it was announced that Audra Smith would not be returning as coach of Clemson.

Coaches 

Notes:
 Year at school includes 2017–18 season.
 Overall and ACC records are from time at current school and are through the end the 2016–17 season.
 NCAA Tournament appearances are from time at current school only.
 NCAA Final Fours and Championship include time at other schools

Preseason

Preseason watch lists 
Below is a table of notable preseason watch lists.

ACC Preseason Media Day 
Prior to the start of the season, the ACC hosted a media day at the Westin Hotel in Charlotte, North Carolina.  At the media day, the head coaches voted on the finishing order of the teams, an All-ACC team, a Preseason Player of the Year, and Newcomers to watch.  The media day was hosted on October 19, 2017.  A selected group of student athletes also took questions from the media on this day.

ACC preseason polls 
At ACC Media Day, the ACC Head Coaches voted on a final finishing order for all ACC teams, as well as a Blue Ribbon Panel.  The results are shown below.

Head Coaches Poll 
First place votes shown in parenthesis.
  
 Notre Dame (8) – 212
 Louisville (1) – 205
 Duke (3) – 200
 Florida State (3) – 188
 Virginia – 148
 Georgia Tech – 141
 Syracuse – 122
 Miami – 113
 North Carolina – 103
 NC State – 97
 Wake Forest – 90
 Virginia Tech – 82
 Clemson – 43
 Boston College – 37
 Pittsburgh – 19

Blue Ribbon Panel 
First place votes shown in parenthesis.
  
 Notre Dame (35) – 858
 Louisville (5) – 809
 Duke (10) – 799
 Florida State (10) – 752
 Miami – 515
 Virginia – 505
 Syracuse – 497
 NC State – 463
 Georgia Tech – 456
 North Carolina – 434
 Virginia Tech – 334
 Wake Forest – 316
 Pittsburgh – 193
 Clemson – 164
 Boston College – 86

Preseason All-ACC Teams

Preseason ACC Player of the Year

Newcomer Watchlist

Regular season

Rankings

Note: The Coaches Poll releases a final poll after the NCAA tournament, but the AP Poll does not release a poll at this time.

Conference matrix
This table summarizes the head-to-head results between teams in conference play. Each team will play 16 conference games, and at least 1 against each opponent.

Player of the week
Throughout the conference regular season, the Atlantic Coast Conference offices named a Player(s) of the week and a Rookie(s) of the week.

Postseason

ACC tournament

NCAA tournament

National Invitation tournament

Honors and awards

ACC Awards

WNBA Draft 

The ACC had 5 players selected in the 2018 WNBA draft.

References